Eauze (Gascon: Eusa) is a commune in the Gers department in southwestern France.

History
Located in the heart of south-west France, 130 kilometers from the Spanish border, Eauze is originally a proto-Basque city that became Roman. It was the capital of the Roman province of Novempopulania until the eighth century. Its Latin name, Elusa, is identical to that of a titular see of Palaestina Tertia, suffragan of Petra.

Geography
Eauze is twinned with Ampuero (Spain).

Climate
The weather is typical of the southwestern French climate, characterized by an oceanic influence and high temperatures in summer. The annual sunshine is around 2,000 hours. In winter, frosts can be large and reach a minimum early morning temperature of -5 °C. On the other hand, summers are favorable to the strong heat and the proximity of the ocean accentuates the temperatures felt which regularly reach 35 to 38 °C. In spring and autumn, temperatures range from 12 to 27 °C.

Sites of interest
Eauze Cathedral is dedicated to Saint Luperculus, who is said to have been a bishop here in the third century before being martyred.

Eauze is also home to the Bureau National Interprofessionel de l'Armagnac (BNIA), the Armagnac brandy's trade association.  The association of this drink with the town comes from one of the first recorded documents of eau de vie, written by Vital du Four, prior of Eauze, in about 1310.

Events
Eauze has a market on Thursday mornings and there is also a separate poultry and rabbit market.

Population

See also
Communes of the Gers department

References

External links

Official Site of the commune of Eauze (French)
Eauze tourist office

Communes of Gers
Gallia Aquitania
Armagnac